Nathan Wesley Ashton (born 30 January 1987 in Beckton, London) is an English footballer who last played for Isthmian League club Tilbury. He is an ex-England youth international, who had several call-ups to the England Under-20 squad.

Career
In the early part of the 2004–05 season, Ashton had an ankle injury, but having shaken this off, he made his first appearances for Charlton Athletic's youth team in the 2005–06 season. Having been named on the bench the previous match, Nathan made his first-team debut in the League Cup against Carlisle United on 19 September 2006.

Ashton signed for Fulham in August 2007, making his debut in the 3–1 win against Reading in November 2007. He never played for the club again.

On 27 March 2008, he joined Crystal Palace on loan until the end of the season, though he only featured for 45 minutes for Palace.

He joined Wycombe Wanderers on 25 July on a two-year deal, though he left on 30 May 2009 with his contract being cancelled by mutual consent after Ashton expressed a desire to play football more regularly.

On 29 October 2009, it was announced that he had joined Wimbledon on a short-term contract, with a view to a longer deal.

He made his debut for AFC Wimbledon against Chester City on 31 October at the Deva Stadium. However, he left the club in search of first team football just two weeks later.

In December 2010, Ashton joined Isthmian League Premier Division side Cray Wanderers scoring on his debut. His stay there, however, did not last long and he soon joined Conference South side Dover Athletic, where he made his debut in a 2–1 victory against Dorchester Town. His first goal for the club came during a final day 4–1 victory over St Albans City. In December 2011, Ashton moved to fellow Conference South club Thurrock,

In the summer of 2013, he moved to Billericay Town. Later in the year, he joined Isthmian League Division One North club, Tilbury. He was released later that season due to off field issues.

Personal life
In 2016, Ashton was convicted of conspiracy to rob in association with firearms offences. He was subsequently sentenced to 15 years imprisonment.

References

External links

England profile at theFA

1987 births
Living people
English footballers
Association football defenders
Charlton Athletic F.C. players
Millwall F.C. players
Fulham F.C. players
Crystal Palace F.C. players
Wycombe Wanderers F.C. players
AFC Wimbledon players
Cray Wanderers F.C. players
Dover Athletic F.C. players
Thurrock F.C. players
Billericay Town F.C. players
Tilbury F.C. players
Premier League players
English Football League players
National League (English football) players
Isthmian League players
England youth international footballers
Footballers from the London Borough of Newham
People from Beckton